Harlan Iver Gustafson (December 29, 1917 – April 18, 1984) was an American football player.  

Gustafson was born in Joliet, Illinois, and attended the University of Pennsylvania.  He played college football for the Penn Quakers football team and was selected by the International News Service as a first-team end on the 1939 College Football All-America Team. He also played baseball for Penn in 1940, compiling a .402 batting average.

Gustafson played professional football in the American Football League for the New York Yankees during the 1940 season and was selected by the league's coaches as a first-team end on the 1940 All-League team. 

Gustafson joined the Naval Reserve in Philadelphia in March 1941.  He began active duty in the United States Navy in December 1941 and served as a Navy pilot through October 1945.  He was rescued after making a forced landing in the Pacific Ocean in early 1944.

Gustafson died in 1984 in Los Angeles, California, at age 66.

References 

1917 births
1984 deaths
American football ends
Penn Quakers baseball players
Penn Quakers football players
New York Yankees (1940 AFL) players
People from Joliet, Illinois
Players of American football from Illinois
Baseball players from Illinois
United States Navy pilots of World War II